is a Japanese voice actor from Chiba Prefecture, Japan. He is affiliated with 81 Produce.

Filmography

Anime
2004
 Grandpa Danger (Gebe, Step Hasegawa)
 Wagamama Fairy: Mirumo de Pon! (Yusuke Natsu, Koichi Sumita, Shirō (season 4))
2005
 Glass Mask (Itō, Matsumoto)
 Hamtaro (Lion)
 Hell Girl (Sasaki)
 MÄR (Kollekio)
 Starship Operators (Iriki Kanno)
 Zoids Genesis (Gotoshi)
2006
 Digimon Data Squad (Blossomon)
 Gin Tama (Sagaru Yamazaki, Saotome, Ōnishi, Wakane)
 Kirarin Revolution (Tomo Kamata)
 Major (Yūichi Izumi, Noguchi)
 Night Head Genesis (Yosuke Tsuzuki)
 Utawarerumono (Chikinaro, Tamua)
 Wan Wan Celeb Soreyuke! Tetsunoshin (Gary Kamata, Kaiser, Rashid)
 Zenmai Zamurai (Torajiro)
2007
 Baccano! (Jon Parnell, Vicky)
 Deltora Quest (Fair, Zhang)
 Gurren Lagann  (Jamoroku)
 Nagasarete Airantō (Etekichi, Fukurō, Kara-age, Pandaro)
 Potemayo (Hajime Kaji)
 Princess Resurrection (Kuroda)
 Shining Tears X Wind (Shumari)
 Tetsuko no Tabi (Masaki Kamimura)
2008
 Golgo 13 (Charlie)
 Sisters of Wellber (Zansu)
2009
 Chrome Shelled Regios (Jaymis)
 Hell Girl: Three Vessels (Shinji Kikyō)
 Natsume's Book of Friends (Harujizō)
 Viper's Creed (Jim)
2011
 Lotte no Omocha! (Professor Mīna)
 Maken-ki! Battling Venus (Goro Fujioka)
2014
 Blade & Soul (Tate Roll)
 Future Card Buddyfight (Demon Lord Asmodai, Card Rhino, Qinus Axia)
 Hero Bank (Delon Arai)
2015
 Omakase! Miracle Cat-dan (Rintaro)
2016
 Duel Masters Versus Revolution Final (Gabe)
2017
 Armed Girl's Machiavellism (Kusuo Masukodera)
2018
 Muhyo & Roji's Bureau of Supernatural Investigation (Teeki)
Bakugan: Battle Planet (Kelion)
2020
 Muhyo & Roji's Bureau of Supernatural Investigation Season 2 (Teeki)

Original Video Animation
Armed Girl's Machiavellism (2017), Kusuo Masukodera

Film
 Gintama: The Movie (Sagaru Yamazaki)
 Gintama: The Movie: The Final Chapter: Be Forever Yorozuya (Sagaru Yamazaki)

Vomic
 Rockin' Heaven (Kazutomo Konishi)

Tokusatsu
2011
 Kaizoku Sentai Gokaiger (Shikabanen (ep. 1))
2017
 Uchu Sentai Kyuranger (Micro Tsuyoindaver (ep. 31))

Dubbing

Live-action
 Shoot 'Em Up (Lone Man (Greg Bryk))

Animation
 Adventure Time (Lumpy Space Princess, Peppermint Butler, Cinnamon Bun, Lumpy Space Prince)
 Bob the Builder (Spud (second voice))
 Mao Mao: Heroes of Pure Heart (King Snugglemane the 25th)
 Moominvalley (The Hemulen)
 Rated A for Awesome (Noam Plinsky)

References

External links
 
 Official profile at 81 Produce

Living people
1980 births
Japanese male voice actors
81 Produce voice actors
Male voice actors from Chiba Prefecture